Cool Off may refer to:

"Cool Off", a song by Wale from his 2012 mixtape Folarin
"Cool Off", a song by Missy Elliott from her 2019 EP Iconology